She'll Take Romance (alternate title: I'll Take Romance) is a 1990 American made-for-television comedy film starring Linda Evans, Tom Skerritt and Larry Poindexter. It was broadcast on ABC on November 25, 1990.

Synopsis
Linda Evans plays Jane McMillan, a Seattle TV meteorologist. Jane is assigned to host a contest to find the most romantic man in Puget Sound. Her boyfriend, played by Tom Skerritt, is a nice but boring judge, who spends most of the time on the sidelines.  Heather Tom plays Caroline, Jane's romance novel-obsessed daughter, who urges her mother to find someone more "dynamic".

She'll Take Romance was filmed on location in Seattle, Washington.

Cast
Linda Evans - Jane McMillan
Tom Skerritt - Judge Warren Danvers
Larry Poindexter - Mike Heller
DeLane Matthews - April August
Heather Tom - Caroline McMillan

References

''I'll Take Romance at NYTimes.com

1990 television films
1990 films
1990 comedy films
American comedy television films
Films shot in Washington (state)
ABC Motion Pictures films
Films directed by Piers Haggard
1990s English-language films
1990s American films